Gold Allure (Japanese: ゴールドアリュール, foaled  March 3rd, 1999 – February 18, 2017) is a Japanese Thoroughbred racehorse and the winner of the 2003 February Stakes.

Career

Gold Allure's first race was on November 11th, 2001 at Kyoto where he came in 2nd place. He won his first race the following month also at Kyoto.

He picked up a pair of wins in April 2002, including a win at the Danno Stakes. He then qualified for his first Grade-1 race, which was the 2002 Tokyo Yūshun, where he came in 5th.

He got his first Grade-1 win when he won the July 4th, 2002 Japan Dirt Derby. He then won another Grade-1 race when he won the Derby Grand Prix in September 2002.

He came in 5th at the November 2002  Champions Cup. He then won the December 29th, 2002 Tokyo Daishōten to start a three race win streak. He captured the 2003 February Stakes, then won the Antares Stakes on April 27th.

Gold Allure then ended his career with an 11th place finish at the Teio Sho on June 25th, 2003.

Stud career
Gold Allure's descendants include:

c = colt, f = filly

Pedigree

References

1999 racehorse births
Racehorses bred in Japan
Racehorses trained in Japan
Thoroughbred family 9-h